The Z80 Operating System with Relocatable Modules and I/O Management (Z80-RIO) is a general-purpose operating system developed by Zilog in the late 1970s for various computer systems including the Z80 Micro Computer System (MCZ-1) series and the Z80 Development System (ZDS). The MCZ systems were primarily used for software development and automation solutions. RIO was designed to facilitate the development and integration of user's programs into a production environment.

Features
The system provides a modest environment with a minimum of system support and an enhanced environment. 

The modest environment provides a program debugger with file manipulation capability, a floppy disk driver (supporting up to eight disk drives), and a basic console driver with provision for paper tape operation.

The enhanced environment provides access to the RIO Executive and to system support utilities such as the Zilog Floppy Disk File System (ZDOS), and the Zilog Hard Disk File System (DFS). It also provides access to a number of disk-resident software such a text editor, macro assembler, and linker.

Commands
The following list of commands are supported by Z80-RIO.

 ACTIVATE
 ALLOCATE
 ASM
 BRIEF
 CAT
 CLOSE
 COMPARE
 COPY
 COPY.DISK
 COPYSD
 DATE
 DEACTIVATE
 DEALLOCATE
 DEBUG
 DEFINE
 DELETE
 DISK.FORMAT
 DISK.REPAIR
 DISK.STATUS
 DISPLAY
 DO
 DUMP
 ECHO
 EDIT
 ERROR
 ERRORS
 EXTRACT
 FORCE
 FORMAT
 HELP
 IMAGE
 INITIALIZE
 LADT
 LINK
 MASTER
 MEMORY
 MOVE
 PAUSE
 RELEASE
 RENAME
 RESTORE_TABS
 SAVE_TABS
 SET
 STATUS
 VERBOSE
 XEQ

Clones
UDOS, a Z80-RIO compatible clone by VEB Robotron, was available for a number of computers by the same company, such as the A 5120 or the PC 1715, which were based on the U880 processor (the latter being a clone of Zilog's Z80). UDOS was also one of the operating systems available for the P8000, a microcomputer system developed in 1987 by the VEB Elektro-Apparate-Werke Berlin-Treptow „Friedrich Ebert“ (EAW) in the German Democratic Republic (DDR, East Germany).

See also
 Federico Faggin

References

External links
 Zilog website
 RIO & PLZ reloaded
 Les Bird's MCZ utilities and RIO OS disk images

Discontinued operating systems
Disk operating systems
Microcomputer software
Proprietary operating systems
Z80